Sint-Laureins (Dutch for Saint Lawrence) is a municipality located in the Flemish province of East Flanders, in Belgium. In 2021, Sint-Laureins had a total population of 6,919. The total area is 74.50 km².

The Our Lady-Church in Watervliet, built in the 16th century, is called the 'Cathedral of the North'.

Gallery

References

External links

Official website 
Official website of the youth council 

Municipalities of East Flanders
Populated places in East Flanders
Sint-Laureins